The following is a list of Major League Baseball players, retired or active.

Ho through Hz

References

External links
Last Names starting with H - Baseball-Reference.com

 Ho-Hz